Sonic Visualiser is an application for viewing and analysing the contents of music audio files. It is free software distributed under the GPL-2.0-or-later that people use to visualise, analyse, and annotate sound files. The program is useful in musical as well as scientific work, and is notable for its ability to use highly specialised third-party plugins  in the vamp plugin format. It was developed at the Queen Mary University of London's Centre for Digital Music and is compatible with Linux, OS X, and Windows operating systems.

See also 

Comparison of free software for audio
List of information graphics software
Baudline
Praat

References

External links 

Changelog / Release Notes
Community and Developer Resources
Documentation for version 3.1.1
Screenshots
Videos

Acoustics software
Audio software
Audio software for Linux
Linux media players
Numerical software
Science software for Linux
Science software for macOS
Science software for Windows
Time–frequency analysis
Unix software